Benn is a surname and given name. It may refer to:

Surname
 A. W. Benn (1843–1915), British rationalist/humanist writer
 Aluf Benn (born 1965), Israeli journalist, author and editor-in-chief of the Israeli national daily newspaper Haaretz
 Anthony Benn (disambiguation), several people
 Arrelious Benn (born 1988), American football player
 Arthur Shirley Benn, 1st Baron Glenravel (1858–1937), British politician
 Brindley Benn (1923–2009), Guyanese politician
 Brittany Benn (born 1989), Canadian rugby union player
 Caroline Benn (1926–2000), British writer, wife of Tony Benn
 Concetta Benn (1926–2011), Australian social worker
 Conor Benn (born 1996), British boxer, son of Nigel Benn
 Emily Benn (born 1989), British politician, granddaughter of Tony Benn
 Sir Ernest Benn, 2nd Baronet (1875–1954), British publisher
 Gottfried Benn (1886–1956), German poet
 Hilary Benn (born 1953), British politician, son of Tony Benn
 James R. Benn (born 1949), American mystery writer
 Jamie Benn (born 1989), Canadian NHL hockey player, brother of Jordie
 Sir John Benn, 1st Baronet (1850–1922), British politician, father of Ernest Benn and William Wedgwood Benn
 Jonathon Benn (born 1967), English retired cricketer
 Jon T. Benn (1935–2018), American businessman, entrepreneur, and actor
 Jordie Benn (born 1987), Canadian NHL hockey player for the Dallas Stars, brother of Jamie Benn
 Margaret Wedgwood Benn (1897–1991), British theologian and women's rights advocate, mother of Tony Benn
 Martin Benn (born ?), Australian chef and restaurateur
 Melissa Benn (born 1957), British writer, daughter of Tony and Caroline Benn
 Mitch Benn (born 1970), British musician and stand-up comedian 
 Nigel Benn (born 1964), British boxer
 Piers Benn (born 1962), British philosopher
 Sissela Benn (born 1980), Swedish actress and comedian
 Sulieman Benn (born 1981), Barbadian spin bowler
 Tony Benn (1925–2014), British politician
 Wallace Benn (born 1947), English retired Anglican bishop
 Wayne Benn (born 1976), English football manager/coach and former footballer
 William Wedgwood Benn, 1st Viscount Stansgate (1877–1960), British politician
 William Benn (divine) (1600–1680), English ejected puritan minister

Given name
 Benn Ferriero (born 1987), American ice hockey player
 Benn Jordan (born 1978), American modern jazz and electronic musician
 Benn Levy (1900–1973), British politician and playwright
 Benn Robinson (born 1984), Australian former rugby union footballer
 Benn Steil, American economist and writer

Nickname or pseudonym
 Benn (Bencjon Rabinowicz; painter) (1905–1989), Polish painter
 Benn Fraker (born 1989), American slalom canoeist

Fictional characters
 Mr Benn, created by David McKee

See also
 Behn (disambiguation)
 Ernest Benn Limited, publishing house

Masculine given names